Quirindi ( or ) is a small town on the North West Slopes region of New South Wales, Australia, in Liverpool Plains Shire.
It is the nearest link to Gunnedah to the west and Tamworth to the north. The local economy is based on agriculture, with broadacre farming dominant on the black soil plains to the west and livestock grazing in the hilly eastern part of the district.

History
The indigenous Gamilaroi people lived in the area for many thousands of years. The name Quirindi comes from the Gamilaraay language, with a number of meanings having been attributed it, which include "nest in the hills", "place where fish breed" and "dead tree on mountain top". Early spellings of the name included "Cuerindi" and "Kuwherindi".

Quirindi Post Office opened on 1 January 1858. The town was gazetted on 19 February 1884.

Heritage listings 
Quirindi has a number of heritage-listed sites, including:
 Main Northern railway: Quirindi railway station

Climate

Sport
Quirindi sporting facilities include several sporting ovals catering for athletics, cricket (Falcons), Rugby League (Quirindi Grasshoppers), Rugby Union (Quirindi Lions), soccer (Qurindi Football Club- QFC formed in 2011), basketball and netball. Other sporting complexes include the racecourse, polo grounds, rodeo, campdrafting, an 18-hole golf course, two tennis clubs, three bowling greens, gun club and swimming complex.

Local Teams/Events 

 Quirindi Falcons Cricket Club
 Quirindi Lions RUFC
 Quirindi Lions FC (Soccer)

One major issue faced by Quirindi's sporting scene was the demise of the local rugby league club, the Quirindi Grasshoppers, who have been in recess since 2017 after years of financial problems. This has left the town without a team in its most popular sport, and forces local players to either travel to play for Murrurundi or Werris Creek, or give up the game they love entirely. 

Quirindi Jockey Club plays host to seven race meetings each year including the Boxing Day Races which attracts thousands of people each year.

Quirindi annual events
 Quirindi Rural Heritage Festival- 1st weekend in May
 Quirindi Show- September
 Boxing Day Races- December
 Prime Stock Show / Hook and Hoof- August
 ANZAC Day Services- Dawn Service and Day time Service 25 April
 Nick Tooth Memorial Rugby Tens Tournament
 Sunflowers on the Plains - January

Surrounding towns

Transport
Quirindi railway station is located on the Main North railway line,  from Sydney. The station opened in 1877,
and continues to be served by daily rail services operated by a NSW TrainLink Xplorer train to and from Sydney and Armidale/Moree.

Quirindi Airport is the local airfield, though most commercial flights in the region use Tamworth Regional Airport.

Notable people
 Ellen Savage, sole surviving nurse from the sinking of the AHS Centaur, advocate for career nursing
 Sir John Oscar Cramer, Australian politician and founding member of Liberal Party
 Ben Smith, former Parramatta Eels NRL player
 Andy Saunders, former NRL player for Canterbury Bulldogs
 Tony Windsor, politician

References

External links

Towns in New South Wales
North West Slopes
Liverpool Plains Shire